Ao Vivo em São Paulo (Live in São Paulo in English) is the fifth album of Banda Calypso also being the first DVD the band. It was recorded in São Paulo on December 17, 2003, in the shows house Patativa, to an audience of over 30,000 people, this meets the hits of the first 3 discs the band. It was released April 2004.

Track listing

CD

DVD

2004 live albums
Portuguese-language live albums
Banda Calypso albums